Yassin Enzo Fortuné (born 30 January 1999) is a French professional footballer.

Early years
Fortuné was born in Aubervilliers, France to a Haitian father and Algerian mother. As a child growing up in the Paris area, Fortuné idolized Arsenal star and fellow countryman Thierry Henry, and has said he patterns his game after him, but compares himself to Danny Welbeck.

Fortuné started his career with Stains F.C. in the Ligue de Paris Île-de-France de football in January 2008. He left the club the same year and joined the third-tier Red Star in France in August. In July 2012, Fortuné signed with RC Lens

At age 16, Fortuné signed his first professional contract in July 2015 with Arsenal on a three-year £3 million deal, with two years as a scholar and one year on professional terms after facing competition from Manchester United.

Though with the club for three years, Fortuné only made 22 appearances for the Arsenal U18, U19 and U23 sides, scoring just two goals and three assists after being marred by injuries.

Club career

FC Sion
In May 2018, after three years of not making a professional appearance for the senior Arsenal club, Fortuné had rejected a new three-year contract offer to stay with the club and agreed to four-year deal with FC Sion of the Swiss first division with Arsenal agreeing to transfer, becoming his first professional club.

It wasn’t until on 16 September 2018 when Fortuné made his professional debut for Sion against Lausanne-Sport. Six days later, on 22 September 2018, he made his league debut for the club, in a 4–1 loss against FC Thun. Fortuné scored his first goal during his first professional start on 30 September 2018 for Sion against Luzern. After making his debut for the club, he appeared in a number of matches. His second goal for the club then came on 11 November 2018, in a 2–1 win over FC Zürich.

Loan to Angers
In 31 January 2021, he was loaned to French Ligue 1 club Angers. He only made one substitute appearance for Angers during the loan.

Loan to Cholet
On 10 August 2021, he moved on a new French loan to Cholet, this time in the third-tier Championnat National.

International career
Fortuné is eligible to play for France, Algeria and Haiti.

Youth career
Fortuné scored 5 goals for France U16 in 11 appearances, scoring against Ukraine U16 and Czech Republic U16.

Between September 2015 and May 2016, Fortuné then represented France U17, scoring 2 goals in 13 appearances, which were against Czech Republic U17 and Denmark U17. He also played three matches during the UEFA European Under-17 Championship tournament.

Fortuné then scored 7 goals in 15 appearances for France U18.

Career statistics

Club

References

External links

1999 births
Sportspeople from Aubervilliers
French sportspeople of Haitian descent
French sportspeople of Algerian descent
Living people
French footballers
Association football forwards
France youth international footballers
Arsenal F.C. players
FC Sion players
Angers SCO players
SO Cholet players
Swiss Super League players
Ligue 1 players
Championnat National players
French expatriate footballers
French expatriate sportspeople in England
French expatriate sportspeople in Switzerland
Expatriate footballers in England
Expatriate footballers in Switzerland
Footballers from Seine-Saint-Denis